This article is about music-related events in 1834.

Events 
 September – Viennese ballerina Fanny Elssler makes her debut with the Ballet du Théâtre de l'Académie Royale de Musique at the Paris Opera's Salle Le Peletier.
 October 7 – Birmingham Town Hall in Birmingham, England, designed by Joseph Hansom and Edward Welch, is opened for the Birmingham Triennial Music Festival.
 Statue of Jean-Jacques Rousseau is erected in his birthplace of Geneva.
Mikhail Glinka returns to Russia after several years away with the intention of composing Russian nationalist music.

Publications 
Pierre Baillot – L'art du violon
J.C. Maugin – Manuel du Luthier

Popular music 
 "Alphabet song" (copyrighted by C. Bradlee)

Classical music 
Charles-Valentin Alkan – Variations sur un thème de Bellini, Op.16 No.5
William Sterndale Bennett – Piano Concerto in C Minor
Hector Berlioz – Harold in Italy
Ole Bull 
Violin Concerto No.1, Op.4
Quartet for Solo Violin
Norbert Burgmuller 
Rhapsodie in B minor for Piano, Op.13
Duo for Piano and Clarinet, Op.15
Luigi Cherubini – String Quartet No. 3 in D minor
Frederic Chopin – Fantaisie-Impromptu (published posthumously in 1855)
Felicien David 
Fantasia harabi
Égyptienne
Vieux Caire
Heinrich Wilhelm Ernst 
Nocturnes for Violin and Piano, Op.8
Thème allemand varié, Op.9
Souvenir du 'Pré aux clercs'
Johann Nepomuk Hummel – Grand rondeau brillant, Op.126
Friedrich Kalkbrenner 
Les Soupirs, Op.121
Thême favori de la 'Norma' de Bellini varié, Op.122
Karol Kurpinski – Polonaise in C major
Franz Paul Lachner 
Waldklänge, Op.28
Symphony No.3, Op.41
Luigi Legnani – Grande Fantasia, Op.61
Franz Liszt – Apparations
Giacomo Meyerbeer 
Le moine
Rachel à Nephtali
James Nares – The souls of the righteous
George Onslow 
3 String Quartets, Op.46
String Quartet No.22, Op.47
Ludwig Schunke 
Caprice No.1, Op.9
Rondeau brillant, Op.11
František Škroup – Kde domov můj?
Louis Spohr –  Erinnerung an Marienbad, Op.89
Mikhail Vysotsky – Fuga of Bach

Opera 
Adolphe Adam – Le Chalet, premiered September 25 in Paris
Daniel Auber – Lestocq, premiered May 24 in Paris
John Barnett – The Mountain Sylph
Gaetano Donizetti – Gemma di Vergy, premiered December 26 in Milan
Konradin Kreutzer – Das Nachtlager in Granada
Saverio Mercadante 
Emma d'Antiochia, premiered March 8 in Venice
Uggiero il danese

Births 
January 1 – Ludovic Halévy, librettist (died 1908)
January 14 – William C. F. Robinson, colonial administrator (d. 1897)
January 20 – Théodore Salomé, composer (died 1896)
January 23 – Josef Löw, composer (died 1886)
January 28 – Sabine Baring-Gould, clergyman, hymn-writer, song collector, writer and scholar (d. 1834)
February 28 – Sir Charles Santley, baritone (d. 1922)
March 1 – Hildegard Werner, conductor (d. 1911)
March 23 – Julius Reubke, pianist, organist and composer (d. 1858)
March 31 – Amalie Wickenhauser-Neruda, pianist (died 1890)
April 1 – Isidore-Edouard Legouix, composer (died 1916)
April 6 – Hart Pease Danks, musician (died 1903)
May 19 – Carl Müllerhartung, composer (died 1908)
June 8 – George Garrett, composer (d. 1897)
June 22 – Frédéric Louis Ritter, composer (died 1891)
June 24 – George Becker, composer and music writer (d. 1928)
August 9 – Elias Álvares Lobo, composer (d. 1901)
August 14 – Alexander Winterberger, composer (died 1914)
August 17 – Peter Benoit, composer (d. 1901)
August 31 – Amilcare Ponchielli, composer (d. 1886)
October 3 – Vilém Blodek, composer (died 1874)
October 4 – Helen Lemmens-Sherrington, opera singer (died 1906)
October 17 – Josephine Pollard, hymnist (died 1892)
October 31 – Knowles Shaw, composer of gospel hymns (d. 1878)
November 2 – Harriet McEwen Kimball, hymnist (died 1917)
November 7 – Ernest Gagnon, composer (died 1915)
November 29 – Sedley Taylor, music theorist (died 1920)
November 30 – Joseph Mosenthal, musician (died 1896)
December 12 – Wilhelmine Clauss-Szarvady, pianist (died 1907)
December 22 – Herman Amberg, composer (died 1902)
date unknown
David Braham, composer (died 1905)
Harry McCarthy, songwriter (died 1888)

Deaths 
January 29 – Johann Gaudenz von Salis-Seewis, librettist (born 1762)
February 4 – Amélie-Julie Candeille, singer, librettist and composer (b. 1767)
April 17 – Catherine Maria Fanshawe, lyricist (born 1765)
June 29 – Alexandre-Étienne Choron, musicologist (born 1771)
September 2 – David Charles, hymn-writer (b. 1762)
August 8 – Silvestro Palma, Italian composer (b. 1754)
October 8 – François-Adrien Boïeldieu, composer (b. 1775)
December 7 – Ludwig Schuncke, composer (b. 1810)
date unknown
Antoine-Laurent Baudron, violinist and composer (b. 1742)
August Duranowski, violinist and composer (b. c. 1770)
Filip Višnjić, gusle player (b. 1767)

References

 
19th century in music
Music by year